Republic of Genoa was rich oligarchic republic, where the authorities were powerful bankers. In the Renaissance, Genoa was not developed into significant arts center, as it was for Florence, Ferrara, Rome, Rimini, and Venice. But in the 17th century Genoa had an original school of painting, called Genoese School, which was to develop Flemish contacts (visits by Rubens and van Dyck). The best painter was Bernardo Strozzi, called il Cappuccino, of great importance also for Venice. Giovanni Castiglione, called Il Grecchetto, took up a genre already made famous by Sinibaldo Scorza with paintings of animals and still lifes under Flemish and Venetian influence. Domenico Fiasella and Gioacchino Assereto joined the Caravaggesque followers, while Valerio Castello was more eclectic. The decorators Domenico Piola and Gregorio de Ferrari worked in the churches and palaces of Genoa.

In the first half of the 18th century Alessandro Magnasco dominated painting with his strange personality, his nervous technique and his exaggerated chiaroscuro; his expressionistic distortions created a fantastic world reminiscent of Salvator Rosa, Marco Ricci, and Francesco Guardi.

List of artists

17th century
Bernardo Strozzi (1581-1644)
Giovanni Benedetto Castiglione (1609-1664) 
Giovanni Battista Gaulli (1639-1709)
Giovanni Battista Carlone (1653–55)
Alessandro Magnasco (1667-1749) 
Domenico Fiasella (1589–1669)
Luca Cambiaso (1527-1585)
Pierre Puget (1622-1694) 
Valerio Castello (1624-1659)
Giovanni Andrea De Ferrari (1598-1669)
Orazio De Ferrari (1606-1657)
Gregorio De Ferrari (c.1647-1726)
Lorenzo De Ferrari (1680-1744)
Valerio Castello (1625-1659)
Bartolomeo Biscaino (1632-1657)
Giulio Benso (1592-1668) 
Domenico Piola (1627-1703)
Giovanni Andrea Ansaldo (1584-1638)
Gioacchino Assereto (1600-1649)
Francesco Maria Schiaffino
Filippo Parodi
Giuseppe Badaracco (1588-1657)
Giovanni Raffaello Badaracco (1648-1726)
Giovanni Stefano Verdura
Carlo Antonio Tavella (1668-1738)
Giuseppe Palmieri (1674-1740)

Bibliography 
 Гос. Эрмитаж. Каталог 1, «Западноевроейская живопись», Ленинград, «Аврора», 1976 

Italian art movements